Kerala Congress (Secular) is a registered regional political party in the Indian state of Kerala. It was a faction of Kerala Congress led by P. C. George, Eapen Varghese, and T. S. John. The party was split from Kerala Congress (M). It had been revived by T.S. John.

History
Kerala Congress (Secular) fraction formed after the split from Kerala Congress (Joseph) On early 2000's . main and leader of the fraction was P.C George however party chairman was T.S. John. PC George was the MLA From Poonjar. Kerala Congress (Secular) was part of LDF then . however he expelled from LDF and forced to join UDF . Kerala Congress (Secular) became part of UDF by  mergered into Kerala Congress (Mani) on 2010. and Pc George became vice chairman of Kerala Congress (Mani) .

Expelled By Mani Family And Revival of Kerala Congress (Secular)
 
In 2015 Mani tried to make his son as his successor, George tried to prevent this power exchange of Mani family. It created a lot of problems between KM Mani and PC George. Other haters of George also want him out of the party So they joined Hand with Mani family As a result, he expelled from party. The supporters of PC George   revived Kerala Congress (Secular) under the leadership of T. S. John.
The haters of PC George later leaved Kerala congress (Mani) stating same reasons.

Merger 2.0
After the Revival of Kerala Congress (Secular) no one in the kerala politics want to work with P.C George So George Was expelled Kerala Congress (Secular) which ultimately  creates many fraction in the party, and they all tried to merge with other parties. P.C George later created his own party called Kerala Janapaksham (Secular) but fate is similler like Kerala Congress (Secular)

First faction 
First group was led by TS John, he  announced its decision to rejoin with  Kerala Congress (Mani) However, a section of the party led by Kallada Das, PA Alexander, A. A. Abraham decided to retain the party.

Second faction 
Second group  of leaders led by PA Alexander and A. A. Abraham, announced its decision to merge with the Nationalist Congress Party (NCP).

Third faction 
Third faction led by Deacon Thomas Kayyathra merged with Kerala Congress (Skaria Thomas) group

fourth faction
fourth the Fraction led by Kallada Das decided to retain the party and join the National Democratic Alliance. Later this faction merged with Kerala Congress (Thomas).
In 2018, Kerala Congress (Secular) Kalalda Das faction merged with Kerala Congress.

References

Defunct political parties in Kerala
Kerala Congress Parties
Political parties established in 2004
2004 establishments in Kerala